José Francisco Rezek (born January 18, 1944 in Cristina) is a Brazilian judge who served as a member of the International Court of Justice, based in The Hague, Netherlands, from 1996 to 2006. His surname "Rezek" comes from Lebanon.

He earned his LL.B and D.E.S degrees from the Federal University of Minas Gerais (Belo Horizonte) and practised as a lawyer for a few years. He then obtained his PhD degree from Paris-Sorbonne University in the 1970s. He followed his academic career on to England, earning a Diploma in Law at Oxford University in  1979 (Wolfson College), after undertaking extension courses and research at Harvard University (1965) and at The Hague Academy of International Law (1968).

He was a Professor of International Law and Constitutional Law at the University of Brasília from 1971 to 1997 and later became Chair of the Department of Law, serving from 1974 to 1976 and Dean of the Faculty of Social Studies from 1978 to 1979. He moved to Rio de Janeiro and held Professorships in International Law at Rio Branco Institute (the official diplomatic school of Brazil) from 1976  to 1997. Rezek was a Lecturer at The Hague Academy of International Law in 1986 and at the Institute of International Public Law and International Relations in Thessaloniki, Greece in 1989.

Rezek is also the president of several conferences, a lecturer and an examiner for professorship contests in the leading Brazilian universities (since 1971). He is currently professor of International Law Theory at University Center of Brasília (UniCEUB). He became Attorney of the Republic in 1972; and Deputy Attorney-General of the Republic from 1979 to 1983. He then became Justice of the Supreme Court of Brazil, appointed by the President with the approval of the Senate, in March, 1983, at the age of 39. He resigned in March 1990 and was appointed again in April, 1992, but retired in 1997.

He was Foreign Minister of Brazil from March 1990 to April 1992 and has been a Member of the Permanent Court of Arbitration since 1987.

External links
 International Court of Justice Member List

References

1944 births
Living people
University of Paris alumni
20th-century Brazilian judges
International Court of Justice judges
The Hague Academy of International Law people
Supreme Federal Court of Brazil justices
Foreign ministers of Brazil
Alumni of Wolfson College, Oxford
Members of the Permanent Court of Arbitration
Brazilian judges of United Nations courts and tribunals
Brazilian judges of international courts and tribunals